"I'll Be Back" is a song written by John Lennon, with some collabration from Paul McCartney (credited to Lennon–McCartney). It was recorded by the English rock band the Beatles for the soundtrack album to their film A Hard Day's Night (1964) but not used in the film. This song was not released in North America until Beatles '65 five months later.

Structure

According to musicologist Ian MacDonald, Lennon created the song based on the chords of Del Shannon's "Runaway" which had been a UK hit in April 1961. Author Bill Harry also wrote: "He just reworked the chords of the Shannon number and came up with a completely different song".

With its poignant lyric and flamenco style acoustic guitars "I'll Be Back" possesses a tragic air and is eccentric in structure. Unusually for a pop song it oscillates between major and minor keys, appears to have two different bridges, and lacks a chorus. The fade-out ending also arrives unexpectedly, being a half stanza premature.

The metric structure also is unusual. The verse is in 6-measure phrases in  time.

Producer George Martin preferred to open and close Beatles albums using dominant material stating: "Another principle of mine when assembling an album was always to go out on a side strongly, placing the weaker material towards the end but then going out with a bang". Ian MacDonald points out however: "Fading away in tonal ambiguity at the end of A Hard Day’s Night, it was a surprisingly downbeat farewell and a token of coming maturity". Music journalist Robert Sandall wrote in Mojo magazine: "'I'll Be Back' was the early Beatles at their most prophetic. This grasp of how to colour arrangements in darker or more muted tones foreshadowed an inner journey they eventually undertook in three albums' time, on Rubber Soul".

Recording

The Beatles recorded "I'll Be Back" in 16 takes on 1 June 1964. The first nine were of the rhythm track, and the last seven were overdubs of the lead and harmony vocals, and an acoustic guitar overdub.

The Anthology 1 CD includes take two of "I'll Be Back", performed in  time. The recording broke down when Lennon fumbled over the words in the bridge, complaining on the take that "it's too hard to sing." The subsequent take, also included on Anthology, was performed in the  time used in the final take.

Personnel 
John Lennon – double-tracked vocal, acoustic rhythm guitar
Paul McCartney – harmony vocal, bass
George Harrison – harmony vocal, classical acoustic guitar, acoustic guitar
Ringo Starr – drums
Personnel per Walter Everett

Notable cover versions
 The Chicago-based band the Buckinghams released a version of this song in 1967 peaking #1 in the Philippines, according to Billboard magazine.
 Cliff Richard covered the song on his 1967 album Don't Stop Me Now!
 The Dutch band Golden Earring covered the song as "I'll Be Back Again" on their 1995 album Love Sweat.
 Shawn Colvin recorded a version of the song as a bonus track on her 2004 Polaroids: A Greatest Hits Collection album.
 New York folk-rock act Gemini Fog covered the song on their 2022 album Kinetic Sleeper.

Notes

References

External links
 

The Beatles songs
Song recordings produced by George Martin
Songs written by Lennon–McCartney
Songs published by Northern Songs
1964 songs
British folk rock songs
Songs written for films